Stepanchenko (Ukrainian or Russian: Степанченко) is a gender-neutral Ukrainian surname. It may refer to:

Sergey Stepanchenko
Vasyl Stepanchenko

See also
 

Ukrainian-language surnames